Ian Robert Young  (11 January 1932 – 27 September 2019) was a British medical physicist, known for his work in the field of magnetic resonance imaging (MRI).

Life 
He was educated at Sedbergh School and later studied physics at Aberdeen University, then worked for EMI from 1976 to 1981, then for GEC from 1981 to 1982, when he became Chief Scientist of the NMR division of Picker International upon its creation.

He became visiting professor of radiology at the Royal Postgraduate Medical School in 1986. He was visiting professor at the Imperial College School of Medicine at Hammersmith Hospital from 1983 to 2001. He is also senior research fellow at Hirst Research Centre.

In 1992, he was awarded an honorary DSc by Aberdeen University. He was elected a Fellow of the Royal Academy of Engineering in 1988. and a Fellow of the Royal Society in 1989. In 1990 he was made an Honorary Fellow of the Royal College of Radiologists, and became an Officer of the Order of the British Empire in the 1986 Birthday Honours. He holds over 40 patents and has authored over 100 papers on MRI.

He won the 2004 Whittle Medal of the Royal Academy of Engineering, and was president of the Society of Magnetic Resonance in Medicine from 1991 to 1992.

He died on 27 September 2019 at the age of 87.

References

External links
"Young, Ian R.: EMI's Venture into NMR—An Industrial Saga",  Encyclopedia of Magnetic Resonance. 15 March 2007

 

1932 births
2019 deaths
Academics of Imperial College London
Fellows of the Royal Society
Fellows of the Royal Academy of Engineering
Officers of the Order of the British Empire